The 2018 Trinidad and Tobago Charity Shield (known as the Digicel Charity Shield for sponsorship reasons) was the sixth edition of the Charity Shield, which is a football match that opened the 2018 Pro League season. The match will be played on 1 June 2018, between the winners of the previous season's TT Pro League and FA Trophy competitions. It officially kicks off the 2018 TT Pro League season. W Connection won their 4th title after beating North East Stars 7–1.

Pre-match

Entry

W Connection qualified by winning the 2017 Trinidad and Tobago FA Trophy , defeating Police 3–1 in the final at Ato Boldon Stadium.
W Connection claimed victories over Tamana United 12–0, Bethel United 3–0, Cunupia 3–2, Guaya United 1-0 and 1976 FC Phoenix 3-0 en route to the final. The 2017 FA Trophy was the Savonetta Boys fifth title and consequently gained a berth in the 2018. Digicel Charity Shield.

North East Stars qualified for their first Charity Shield by clinching the TT Pro League title on 24 November 2018. It was their first Pro League title since 2004.
North East Stars started Pro League by going 6 games unbeaten until they slipped up 1–0 against Point Fortin Civic F.C. From there they were already top of the league. The club would go on to lose only one game to finish 7 points ahead of second place W Connection and secured their second title after a thirteen-season drought.

Match

DetailsAssistant referees:Kevin Lewis
Kerron MayersFourth official:'
Kwinsi Williams

See also
 2017 TT Pro League
 2017 FA Trophy

References

2018
Charity Shield